The Avia BH-33 was a biplane fighter aircraft built in Czechoslovakia in 1927. It was based on the BH-21J which demonstrated promising results by combining the original BH-21 airframe with a licence-built Bristol Jupiter radial engine. Other than the peculiar Avia hallmark of having an upper wing with a shorter span than the lower, it was utterly conventional, even featuring a tail fin for the first time in a Pavel Beneš and Miroslav Hajn design (previous aircraft had a rudder but no fin).

Design and development
Initial tests of the first prototype were disappointing, displaying performance only marginally better than the BH-21, even when fitted with a more powerful version of the Jupiter. Two further prototypes followed, both designated BH-33-1, each with an increasingly powerful Jupiter variant – one a Jupiter VI, the other a Jupiter VII. The performance of the latter example was finally acceptable for the Czechoslovakian defence ministry to order a small production run of only five aircraft.

Three examples were sold to Belgium, where there were plans to build the type under licence, but this did not occur. Licence production was undertaken, however, in Poland, where a single example was sold, along with a licence to build 50 aircraft. These were designated PWS-A and put into service with the Polish Air Force in 1930.

Development continued with an almost total redesign of the fuselage, replacing the wooden, slab-sided structure with one of oval cross-section, built up from welded steel tubes. Designated BH-33E, this was a world-class fighter for its time. Nevertheless, the response from the Czechoslovakian military was lukewarm (although two were bought for the national aerobatics team), and Avia again looked abroad for customers, this time selling 20 aircraft to the Kingdom of Yugoslavia, along with a licence to produce another 24. Two or three examples were also bought by Soviet Union for evaluation.

In late 1929, a further development was flown as the BH-33L, featuring longer-span wings, and a Škoda L W-block engine. This version finally brought the company the domestic sales that it had been hoping for, with 80 aircraft ordered by the Czechoslovak Air Force. These became standard equipment with some air regiments up to the outbreak of World War II.

A single, final variant with a BMW-built Pratt & Whitney Hornet engine was built as the BH-33H (later redesignation BH-133) in 1930, but this did not lead to production.

Operational history
The planes were used by Spanish Republican Air Force during Spanish-Civil War.
Czechoslovakian BH-33s never saw combat, and Poland's examples had long been replaced in service by the time of the German invasion. Two Yugoslavian machines did, however see combat against Luftwaffe Messerschmitt Bf 109s, but were both destroyed and their pilots killed.

Variants
BH-33
First prototype.
BH-33-1
Two prototypes powered by Jupiter VI (second) and Jupiter VII (third) engines plus five serial built aircraft with Jupiter VII engine.
BH-33E
Rebuilt fuselage
BH-33E-SHS
Yugoslav Version powered by IAM K9 engine, 22 built.
BH-33L
Version with longer-span wings, powered by a Škoda L engine, 80 built.
BH-33H (BH-133)
Version powered by Pratt & Whitney Hornet engine, one built.
P.W.S.A
Polish license-built variant of the BH-33 with minor modifications, 50 built between 1929 and 1932.

Operators

Belgian Air Force received three BH-33-1 aircraft.

Air Force of the Independent State of Croatia

Czechoslovakian Air Force
Czechoslovakian National Security Guard

Hellenic Air Force acquired five Yugoslav-produced BH-33s, during the 1935 coup, when Greece was a republic.

Polish Air Force received one BH-33 and 50 PWS-A license-built variant.

Slovak Air Force (1939–45)

Soviet Air Force bought two or three BH-33Es for tests.

 Spanish Republican Air Force

Yugoslav Royal Air Force

Specifications (BH-33L)

See also

References

Bibliography

Further reading

World Aircraft Information Files. London: Bright Star Publishing, File 889 Sheet 86.

External links
 
 airwar.ru (in Russian)

Single-engined tractor aircraft
Biplanes
1920s Czechoslovakian fighter aircraft
BH-33
Aircraft first flown in 1927